The FIL European Luge Natural Track Championships 1981 took place in Niedernsill, Austria. This was the second time the city has hosted the championships after having done so in 1974.

Men's singles

Women's singles

Men's doubles

Medal table

References
Men's doubles natural track European champions
Men's singles natural track European champions
Women's singles natural track European champions

FIL European Luge Natural Track Championships
Kitzbühel Alps
1981 in luge
1981 in Austrian sport
Luge in Austria
International sports competitions hosted by Austria